Manasutho is a 2002 Indian Telugu-language romantic film directed by A. S. Ravi Kumar Chowdary and produced by Venigalla Ananda Prasad. It music and background score were by Ashirwad. The film stars Akash, Arzoo Govitrikar.

Plot
Manasutho is romantic drama concerning the relationship between Kanshik and Sapna.

Cast

Akash as Kanishk
Arzoo Govitrikar as Sapna
Brahmanandam
Sudha
Khayyum
Vijayabhaskar
AVS 
Sudha Prasad Babu
Narra Venkateswara Rao
M.S. Narayana
Mamatha Chowdary
 Sudeepa
 Devisri
Abhijit
 Bhasa
 Gopi
 Anil
 SV Krishna Reddy
 Chandan
 Sweety 
 Sudhakar Komakula

References

External links

2002 films
2000s Telugu-language films